Ronald Magill (born February 28, 1960) is an American wildlife expert and photographer; he is the communications director of the Miami-Dade Zoological Park and Gardens, and makes regular television appearances across local South Florida networks. Magill has won five Emmy Awards for his work on the nature documentary programs; Dreams of Alaska, The Amazon & Beyond, "Alligator Love," and Dreams of the Rain Forest.

Magill was born in New York City, New York, but moved to Perrine, Florida at the age of 12, where he later attended Miami Palmetto High School and obtained an associate's degree at the University of Florida. His first job was working at the Miami Serpentarium, which no longer exists. In 1980, he became a zookeeper at Miami MetroZoo and gradually became lead zookeeper, senior zookeeper and then assistant curator.

Today, Magill remains at the renamed Miami-Dade Zoological Park and Gardens, as its communications director and makes appearances on television shows such as Good Morning America, and The Today Show. He appeared for over 25 years on the iconic Spanish variety program Sabado Gigante until the show ended its over 50-year run in 2015.  He has a regular segment on The Dan Le Batard Show with Stugotz, where listeners can call in and ask him questions, often humorous or irreverent. He has also appeared on several documentaries for the Discovery Channel and the History Channel, and, during the 1980s, handled many of the animals used on the Miami Vice television series.

In 2006, Magill received the Wildlife Ambassador Award in recognition of his efforts on wildlife preservation. Magill was the founder for the Cheetah Ambassador Program at Zoo Miami. Magill is also a Nikon Ambassador.

Early life
Ron's father Guillermo Magill was a tall man of six-foot-three. Guillermo spoke no English when he moved from Santiago, Cuba to New York and met his wife Lorraine. Born in 1960, Ron Magill was living in Queens, New York. In 1972, he moved to Florida with the family.   His parents had purchased a five-acre parcel of land in southern Miami-Dade, Florida, to grow mangoes and avocados. Even though Ron's first language was Spanish, he would forget it in school because he was bullied by students about his Hispanic culture and tall height.  He was the tallest student in class and classmates would call him Lurch, Frankenstein or names like "Magilla Gorilla." His unwanted attention pushed him into books and he had skipped fourth grade. Ron had moved to Florida in 1972 and lived on the land that was purchased in a home that his father built and he often cared for injured or sick animals he would find there as well as helping to raise two horses.

References

External links
 

1960 births
Living people
American naturalists
Nature photographers
Zoo directors
Zoo curators
University of Florida alumni
People from Queens, New York
American people of Cuban descent
Emmy Award winners
Scientists from New York (state)